John Carroll Grimek (June 17, 1910 – November 20, 1998) was an American bodybuilder and weightlifter active in the 1930s and 1940s. He was Mr. America in 1940 and 1941, and Mr. Universe in 1948. Throughout his career he carried the nicknames "The Monarch of Muscledom" and "The Glow."

Life
Grimek was born in Perth Amboy, New Jersey, the son of Slovak immigrants George and Maria Grimek, peasants from the village Ústie nad Oravou in northern Slovakia.

Grimek moved to York, Pennsylvania in 1935 to join Bob Hoffman, the founder of York Barbell. Besides his bodybuilding exploits, Grimek also represented the United States in weightlifting at the 1936 Olympic Games in Berlin, where he took 9th place in the men's heavyweight category.

Grimek was Mr. America in 1940 and 1941, and Mr. Universe in 1948. In 1949, he won his last contest, the AAU Mr. USA, against a field that included Steve Reeves, Clarence Ross, George Eiferman, and Armand Tanny. Grimek retired from bodybuilding undefeated.

Grimek featured in many bodybuilding articles and magazines. He was also the editor of Muscular Development. Despite his retirement, he continued serious training for many years, and was still able to perform squats with over 400 pounds for repetitions in his late 60s. Grimek died on November 20, 1998, in York, Pennsylvania, at the age of 88.

Posthumous tributes
Grimek was inducted into the IFBB Hall of Fame in 1999.

He is depicted as part of a mural located at 37 West Philadelphia Street in York, Pennsylvania, which was finished in 2000.

References

External links
IFBB Hall of Fame profile
Classic Bodybuilder
Clarence Bass on Grimek
John Grimek – Hall of Fame at Weightlifting Exchange
John Grimek: "The Monarch Of Muscledom"
Index of archived Iron Game History articles, many about Grimek, mainly those in the April 1999 issue
MuscleMemory

1910 births
1998 deaths
American bodybuilders
American male weightlifters
American people of Slovak descent
Olympic weightlifters of the United States
People associated with physical culture
Professional bodybuilders
Sportspeople from Perth Amboy, New Jersey
Weightlifters at the 1936 Summer Olympics
20th-century American people